This article provides a list of people from the city of Bremen. Bremen is a Hanseatic city in northwestern Germany, which belongs to the Free Hanseatic City of Bremen (also called just "Bremen" for short), a federal state of Germany.

Early times to 1800
Adam of Bremen (fl. 1066), author of chronicles and histories of Germany and Scandinavia.
Johann Rode von Wale (c.1445–1511), Catholic cleric; Doctor of Canon and Civil Law; chronicler; long-serving government official (1468–1497); as John III, was Prince-Archbishop of Bremen, 1497–1511
Arnoldus Clapmarius (1574–1604), German academic, jurist, humanist, known for his writings on statecraft
Johannes Cocceius (1603–1669), Dutch theologian born in Bremen.
Frans Banninck Cocq (1605–1655), Mayor of Amsterdam, central figure in Rembrandt's masterpiece The Night Watch
Riksfriherre Sir Johan Fredrik von Friesendorff, 1st Baronet (1617–1669), Swedish diplomat born in Bremen
Henry Oldenburg (1619–1677), secretary of the Royal Society
Franz Wulfhagen (c. 1624–1670), German Baroque painter and engraver
Ulrik Frederik Gyldenløve, Count of Laurvig (1638–1704), general in Norway during the Scanian War; illegitimate son of King Frederick III of Denmark and Norway
Heinrich von Cocceji (1644–1719), professor of natural and international law at the Heidelberg University
Joachim Neander (1650–1680), rector, pastor, hymn writer.
Johann Baring (1697–1748), name later anglicised to John Baring, German-British merchant; founder of Barings Bank 
Hermanus Meyer (1733–1791), clergyman of the Dutch Reformed Church in America 
Johann Peter Berg (1737–1800), German Protestant theologian, historian and orientalist
Wilhelm Olbers (1758–1840), physician and astronomer.
Blasius Merrem (1761–1824), naturalist, zoologist, ornithologist, mathematician, and herpetologist 
Albertus Henricus Wiese (1761–1810), Governor-General of the Dutch East Indies, 1805–1808
Gerhard Ludvig Lahde (1765–1833), Prussian-born Danish printmaker and publisher
Gottfried Reinhold Treviranus (1776–1837), naturalist and botanist, discovered the intercellular space in a plant's parenchyma.
Hermann Ernst Freund (1786–1840), German-born Danish sculptor of figures from Nordic mythology

1800 to 1850
Hermann Heinrich Winter (1805–1884), farmer, local official, member of Wisconsin State Assembly
Johann Georg Kohl (1808–1878), travel writer, historian, geographer and librarian

Friedrich Wagenfeld (1810–1846), German philologist and author
Henry Bohlen (1810–1862), American Civil War Union Brigadier General
Carl Johann Steinhäuser (1813–1879), German sculptor in the classical style
Nicolaus Delius (1813–1888), German philologist and student of Shakespeare. 
Gustav Hartlaub (1814–1900), German physician and ornithologist
Johann Heinrich Wilhelm Henzen (1816–1887), German philologist and epigraphist
Julie Schwabe (1818–1896), socialite, education activist and philanthropist, lived in Manchester, UK
Carl Wilhelm von Zehender (1819–1916), ophthalmologist, pioneer of ophthalmic microsurgery
Wilhelm Paul Corssen (1820–1875), German philologist; worked on Latin and Etruscan topics.
Frederick L. Schmersahl (1825-c.1905), German-American merchant and eleventh Mayor of Hoboken, New Jersey
Adolf Bastian (1826–1905), polymath ethnography and anthropologist.
Charles Henry Nimitz (1826–1911), in 1852 built the Nimitz Hotel in Fredericksburg, Texas
Amalie Murtfeldt (1828-1888), German painter
Arnold Huchting (1828–1901), member of the Wisconsin State Assembly
Frederick Halterman (1831-1907), U.S. Congressman
Friedrich Gerhard Rohlfs (1831–1896), geographer, explorer, author and adventurer.
Henry Timken (1831–1909), inventor, founded the Timken Roller Bearing Company
Hermann Ottomar Herzog (1832–1932), European and American artist of landscapes, from the Düsseldorf school of painting
August Wilmanns (1833–1917), classical scholar and librarian

Franz Adolf Eduard Lüderitz (1834–1886), merchant and colonist
Johann Georg Poppe (1837–1915), prominent architect during the German Gründerzeit and interior designer of ocean liners for Norddeutscher Lloyd 
Frederick Charles Winkler (1838–1921), American Civil War Union brigadier general
John Henry Niemeyer (1839–1932), German-born painter, taught drawing at Yale University
Heinrich Averbeck (1844–1889), physiotherapist

1850 to 1900
Hermann Ebbinghaus (1850–1909), German psychologist, studied memory, discovered the forgetting curve and the spacing effect 
Sir Hermann Gollancz (1852–1930), British rabbi and Hebrew scholar
Johann Heinrich Burchard (1852–1912), Hamburg lawyer, politician, senator, First Mayor of Hamburg
August Kühne (1855–1932), German businessman, co-founder in 1890 of Kuehne + Nagel
Heinrich Wiegand (1855-1909), German lawyer and  general director of the Norddeutscher Lloyd shipping company 
Carl David Tolmé Runge (1856–1927), German mathematician, physicist, and spectroscopist
Adolph Fischer (1858–1887), an anarchist and labor union activist, tried and executed in the US after the Haymarket Riot
Ludwig Quidde (1858–1941), pacifist politician and Nobel Peace Prize laureate 1927
Ludwig Hermann Plate (1862–1937), German zoologist and disciple of Ernst Haeckel
Theodor Siebs (1862–1941), German linguist, author of Deutsche Bühnenaussprache in 1898
Johann Gerhard Husheer (1864–1954), New Zealand tobacco grower, industrialist and philanthropist
Heinrich Bulle (1867–1945), German archaeologist
Wilhelm Vöge (1868–1952), German art historian, discovered the Reichenau School of painting, important medievalist
Karl Hampe (1869–1936), German historian of the High Middle Ages
Heinrich Vogeler (1872–1942), German painter, Düsseldorf school of painting, designer and architect
Friedrich August Georg Bitter (1873–1927), German botanist and lichenologist
Edward Voigt (1873–1934), emigrated 1883, U.S. Representative from Wisconsin
Ludwig Roselius (1874–1943), patron of the arts, coffee merchant and founder of KAFFEE HAG
Edward Ernst Kleinschmidt (1876–1977), prolific inventor; one of the inventors of the teleprinter
Karl Abraham (1877–1925), German psychoanalyst, collaborator of Sigmund Freud
Heinrich Georg Barkhausen (1881–1956), German physicist, discovered the Barkhausen effect in 1919
Karl Alfred Pabst (1884–1971), painter, graphic artist and lithographer, worked and died at Bremen
Hans Dreier (1885–1966), film art director
Herbert von Böckmann (1886–1974), German general of the infantry
Grover Cleveland Loening (1888–1976), American aircraft manufacturer
Henrich Focke (1890–1979), German aviation pioneer, co-founder of Focke-Wulf
Bernhard Hans Henry Scharoun (1893–1972), German architect, designed the Berlin Philharmonic concert hall, exponent of organic and expressionist architecture
Lieutenant Friedrich Theodor Noltenius (1894–1936), German flying ace in the First World War
Friedrich Ebert Jr. (1894–1979), Reichstag deputy (SPD), SED politician, Lord Mayor of East Berlin (1948–1967)
Friedrich Forster (1895–1958), pseudonym for Waldfried Burggraf, dramatist and screenwriter 
Emil Trinkler (1896–1931), Central Asian geographer and explorer
Eberhard Gildemeister (1897–1978), German architect, designed the Sparkasse building on Bremen's market square
Georg Kulenkampff (1898–1948), violinist

1900 to 1950
Ada Halenza (1900–1990), writer
Wilhelm Wagenfeld (1900–1990), industrial designer 
Georg Ferdinand Duckwitz (1904–1973), German diplomat, contributed to the rescue of 7000 Danish Jews
Hans Biebow (1902–1947), chief of Nazi administration of the Łódź Ghetto executed for war crimes
Alexander Piorkowski (1904–1948), Nazi commandant of Dachau concentration camp
Harald Damsleth (1906–1971), Norwegian cartoonist, illustrator, ad-man, known for his WW2 posters for Nasjonal Samling
Harald Genzmer (1909–2007), composer of contemporary classical music
Hanna Kunath (1909–1994), pilot
Gerda Krüger-Nieland (1910–2000), lawyer and judge
Bernard Adolph Schriever (1910–2005), also known as Bennie Schriever, United States Air Force general
Heinz Linge (1913–1980), SS officer; served as a valet for German dictator Adolf Hitler
Reinhard Hardegen (born 1913), Member of Bremen Parliament and former U-boat commander of submarine U-123
Karl Carstens (1914–1992), German politician (CDU), former President of the Federal Republic of Germany

Hermann Uhde (1914–1965), Wagnerian baritone, died on stage of a heart attack during a performance in Copenhagen
Gustav Böhrnsen (1914–1998), politician, trade unionist and resistance fighter
Karl-Heinz Höcker (1915–1998), German theoretical nuclear physicist; worked on the German nuclear weapon project
Friedrich Thielen (1916–1993), German politician with the CDU and the German Party 
Herbert Vighnāntaka Günther (1917–2006), German Buddhist philosopher and Professor of Far Eastern Studies at the University of Saskatchewan 
Cato Bontjes van Beek (1920–1943), German member of the German resistance to Nazism, guillotined Plötzensee Prison
Hans-Joachim Kulenkampff (1921–1998), actor, quizmaster, German actor and TV host 
Doris Kuhlmann-Wilsdorf (1922–2010), German metallurgist
Robert Last (1923–1986), German drummer and bandleader
Sir Selwyn Charles Cornelius-Wheeler CMG (1923–2008), known as Charles Wheeler, British journalist and BBC broadcaster
Hilmar Hoffmann (1925–2018), founder of Oberhausen film festival, cultural politician in Frankfurt, director of Goethe-Institut
Kai Warner (1926–1982), German bandleader and musician, brother of James Last and Robert Last
Hans Otte (1926–2007), composer
Hans-Joachim Bremermann (1926–1996), German-American mathematician and biophysicist, wrote Bremermann's limit
Günter Meisner (1926–1994), German TV and film character actor
James Last (1929–2015), composer and big band leader
Hans-Christof von Sponeck (born 1939), German diplomat, served as a UN Assistant Secretary-General and UN Humanitarian Coordinator for Iraq
Luise Kimme (1939–2013), German artist, sculptor and professor at the Kunstakademie Düsseldorf
Volker Spengler (1939–2020), German actor
Hans Wilhelm (born 1945), German-American writer, children's book author, illustrator and artist
Uwe Windhorst (born 1946), German neuroscientist, systems scientist and cyberneticist
Christina Kubisch (born 1948), German composer, performance artist, professor and flautist

1950 to modern times
Barbara Sukowa (born 1950), German theatre and film actress
Juergen Nogai (born 1953), architectural photographer and filmmaker
Jürgen Trittin (born 1954), German Green politician, Federal Minister for the Environment, Nature Conservation and Nuclear Safety, 1998–2005
Klaus Kleinfeld (born 1957), former CEO of Siemens AG
Piet Klocke (born 1957), musician, cabaret artist, author and actor
Gert Postel (born 1958), medical impostor
Bernhard Siegert (born 1959), German media theorist and media historian
Sven Regener (born 1961), musician and writer
Falko E. P. Wilms (born 1961), economist and social scientist
Torsten Albig (born 1963), politician (SPD)
Martin Blessing (born 1963), German banker, Chairman of Commerzbank AG
Bärbel Schäfer (born 1963), television presenter and wife of Michel Friedman
Barbara Stühlmeyer (born 1964), German musicologist, church musician, writer and scholar of Hildegard of Bingen
Kersten Artus (born 1964), German journalist, politician; member of The Left;  member of the Hamburg Parliament
Ben Becker (born 1964), German actor, brother of Meret Becker
Maren Niemeyer (born 1964), journalist, author, and documentary filmmaker
Meret Becker (born 1969), German actor, sister of Ben Becker
Esther Haase (born 1966), German photographer and film director, lives in Hamburg and London
Claudia Garde (born 1966), German film director and screenwriter 
André Erkau (born 1968), film director and screenplay writer
Stephan Bodzin (born 1969), German DJ, techno-producer, label owner and live artist 
Claudio Martínez Mehner (born 1970), Spanish piano soloist and pedagogue
Julia Hasting (born 1970), German graphic designer, creative director of Phaidon Press
Friedemann Friese (born 1970), designer of Power Grid and other board games
Martin Welzel (born 1972), German organist, musicologist, and music educator; former student of Käte van Tricht (Organist at Bremen Cathedral), associate organist at Munich Cathedral 2021-2022 
Bas Böttcher (born 1974), a German slam poet and visiting lecturer at the German Literature Institute in Leipzig
Marco Da Silva (born 1977), Portuguese dancer and choreographer 
Nils Mönkemeyer (born 1978), German violist and academic teacher, teaches at the Musikhochschule Munich
Jan Böhmermann (born 1981), German satirist and television presenter
Murat Kurnaz (born 1982), Guantanamo Bay prisoner for four years
Anna-Lena Schwing (born 1996), German actress

Sportspeople
Uwe Behrens (born 1959), retired footballer
Terrence Boyd (born 1991), footballer for the USA and 1. FC Kaiserslautern 
Julian Brandt (born 1996), professional soccer player for Borussia Dortmund and Germany
Birgit Dressel (1960–1987), heptathlon athlete
Angelique Kerber (born 1988), German professional tennis player
Louis Krages (1949–2001), racing driver and businessman
Simon Lizotte (born 1992), professional disc golf player, PDGA# 8332
Jonathan Schmude (born 1992), footballer
Bert Trautmann (1923–2013), German football goalkeeper
Florian Wellbrock (born 1997), swimmer

See also
List of mayors of Bremen

References 

Bremen
 
Bremen-related lists